Israel is scheduled to compete at the 2017 World Aquatics Championships in Budapest, Hungary from 14 July to 30 July.

Open water swimming

Israel has entered seven open water swimmers

Swimming

Israeli swimmers have achieved qualifying standards in the following events (up to a maximum of 2 swimmers in each event at the A-standard entry time, and 1 at the B-standard):

Men

Women

* Murez won the swim-off race against Netherlands' Maud van der Meer to compete in the semifinals.

Mixed

Synchronized swimming

Israel's synchronized swimming team consisted of 10 athletes (10 female).

Women

 Legend: (R) = Reserve Athlete

References

Nations at the 2017 World Aquatics Championships
2017
2017 in Israeli sport